Executive Plaza can refer to:
Executive Plaza Building (Detroit, Michigan)
Executive Plaza at Rockefeller Center, mixed use apartment and hotel in New York City